Woodstock Villa is a 2008 Indian Hindi-language mystery thriller film directed by Hansal Mehta and produced by Sanjay Gupta and Ekta Kapoor. It features newcomers Sikandar Kher, Neha Oberoi and Arbaaz Khan in the primary roles while Shakti Kapoor, Gulshan Grover and Sachin Khedekar essay other significant roles. The soundtrack was composed by Anu Malik. It was filmed in Mumbai and Mauritius. The film, which was released in India on 30 May 2008, had a poor box office opening but earned mostly positive reviews. Sanjay Dutt has a cameo appearance. The movie is loosely based on the 2000 Japanese thriller Chaos.

Plot
Zara Kampani (Neha Oberoi) meets Sameer (Sikandar Kher) in a pub and lands in his flat asking him to kidnap her so that she can test her husband, Jatin's (Arbaaz Khan) love. Sameer can't refuse because he is in desperate need of money. He hasn't paid his rent for months and has to return a huge sum of money to a relative (Gulshan Grover).

Zara takes Sameer to Woodstock Villa, the location of the kidnapping. Sameer orders Jatin to hand over 5 million to him. After returning, Sameer discovers Zara is dead. An anonymous caller then threatens that he has only 30 minutes to bury the body and clear up all the evidence. He disposes of her body in a forest and returns.

To be on the safe side, he goes to Bangalore. Sameer sees Zara's video on television and heads back to find the truth. He finds Zara and convinces her to tell him the truth. Zara reveals that she and Jatin truly loved each other. Once in a fight, Jatin's real wife, Zara, accidentally died and as her and Zara's faces were quite similar, she played the role of Zara. The kidnapping plan was hatched by Jatin and his girlfriend to get out of this murder and trap somebody else. Sameer calls Jatin to Woodstock Villa with the money and he pays his rent and loan.

He goes to the airport while Jatin gets caught by the police. Jatin tells the police that he was not the only one to commit the crime. Sameer gives a bag to Zara but there is no money inside that bag; he had taken the real bag of money. The ball was in Zara's court. If she boarded the plane, Sameer would have trusted her. She decided to cheat Sameer and got cheated herself. Sameer's flight takes off while Jatin's partner gets arrested.

Cast
 Sikandar Kher as Sameer Chopra / Akshay Kapadia
 Neha Oberoi as Zara Kampani
 Arbaaz Khan as Jatin Kampani
 Gulshan Grover as Karim Bhai
 Shakti Kapoor as Mr. Amit Chawla, Sameer's landlord
 Sachin Khedekar
 Gaurav Gera as Ajay Varma
 Sanjay Dutt (special appearance in the song "Wo Raaton Se Neende Churati Hai")
 Aryans (special appearance in the song "Wo Raaton Se Neende Churati Hai")

Production
Sikander Kher had several expectations from the media on his debut film. Although his family name would provide recognition, he chose to have his only his first name listed on the credits. Sanjay Gupta, the producer of Woodstock Villa is the uncle of the other newcomer, Neha Oberoi. She said it was exciting and challenging to play the role of a kidnapped wife.

Release and reception
had its world premiere in Mumbai on 30 May 2008. 

Khalid Mohamed of Hindustan Times gave the film 1 star out of 5, terming the film as "out of stock villa". He further wrote ″Of the cast, Neha Uberoi evidently needs some Whistling Woodstocks lessons in acting and make-up. First-timer Sikandar has a screen presence. For sure, he has potential but is obviously restricted by the screenplay and direction (for instance, he isn’t even assigned any dance moves in a disco set piece). You’d like to see him again but not in that grungy look that went out with..Prem Chopra, Ranjeet..oh forget it. It’s becoming a tough life at the movies. Taran Adarsh of Bollywood Hungama gave the film 2 stars out of 5, writing ″On the whole, WOODSTOCK VILLA has decent merits and holds appeal for those with an appetite for hardcore thrillers. But its release has coincided with the climax of the IPL matches and that would really hit the business of this film hard.″Times of India'' gave the film 3.5 stars out of 5, writing ″Go, get your thrills and celebrate the birth of a new actor who, with the right choices, could end up as the new action hero in a namby-pamby age. A word about the music: while the songs do impede the pace of the film, they have a tonal freshness and a refreshing new zing.″

Soundtrack
 "Dhoka" – Anchal Bhatia
 "Saawan Mein Lag Gayee Aag" – Mika Singh
 "Kyun" – The Aryans, Bappi Lahiri
 "Yeh Pyaar Hai" – Anchal Bhatia, Shaan
 "Koi Chala Ja Raha Hai" – Rahat Fateh Ali Khan
 "Raakh Ho Ja Tu" – Shibani Kashyap
 "Dhoka Dega" – Shibani Kashyap
 "Saawan Mein Lag Gayee Aag" (Club Mix) – Mika Singh
 "Dhoka" (Remix) – Anchal Bhatia

References

External links
 

2008 films
2000s Hindi-language films
Films scored by Bappi Lahiri
Indian mystery thriller films
2000s mystery thriller films
Films scored by Anu Malik
Indian remakes of Japanese films